Lak Lak Ashian (also Romanized as Lak Lak Āshīān) is a village in Darbqazi Rural District, in the Central District of Nishapur County, Razavi Khorasan Province, Iran. At the 2006 census, its population was 88, in 29 families.

Castle of Lak Lak Ashian 
The Castle of Lak Lak Ashian is a castle in ruins situated in this village. This castle was built during the reign of Qajar dynasty in Iran. This castle has been registered as part of the national heritage of Iran with the registration number of 12062.

Gallery

References 

Populated places in Nishapur County